Contact Trio was a jazz group from the Ruhr area of Germany that existed from 1970 to 1984. The band was one of the first  professional jazz groups in the Ruhr area and released four albums. The founding members of the group included clarinetist Theo Jörgensmann, bassist Alois Kott, and drummer Michael Jüllich.

Career
The trio performed primarily in Germany and Switzerland. Jörgensmann played from 1970 to 1973 with the trio. When he left, guitarist Evert Brettschneider joined the group. In the early 1980s, Michael Jüllich left the band. He was replaced by drummer Peter Eisold. The Contact Trio performed at the Deutsches Jazzfestival in 1974 and the Berlin Jazz Festival in 1981.

Since 2015 there is a new edition of the band as Contact 4tett, which includes the former soloists of the band Theo Jörgensmann and Evert Brettschneider. The other members are Kai Kanthak, electric bass and Bernd Oezsevim, drums.

Discography 
 Contact (Blackfield, 1972) 
 Double Face (Calig, 1975)
 New Marks (Japo, 1978)
 Musik (Japo, 1981)

References

External links 
 Contact Trio Discogs

Krautrock musical groups
German experimental musical groups
Musical quartets
Jazz fusion ensembles
Avant-garde music groups
German jazz ensembles
Musical groups established in 1970
1970 establishments in West Germany
Musical groups disestablished in 1984
Musical trios
German progressive rock groups
Free improvisation ensembles